Rewind may refer to:

General uses
 Rewind, the process of winding magnetic tape inside a cassette or a microfilm reel backwards to a previous point on the reel
 Rewind symbol, a media control symbol indicating tape rewind or analogous operations
 Rewind (C), in the C programming language, an input/output function
 Rewind slitting or roll slitting; the process for slitting down large rolls of material into smaller rolls

Film and television
 Rewind (2013 film), an American TV film by Jack Bender
 Rewind (2019 film), an American documentary film
 Rewind (TV channel), a Canadian cable television network
 Rewind TV, a free-to-air American entertainment channel
 Rewind (Australian TV series), a 2004 history program
 Rewind (South Korean TV series), a 2019–2020 variety program
 Rewind with Samina Peerzada, the 2017 first series of the Pakistani streaming TV talk show With Samina Peerzada
 "Rewind" (Agents of S.H.I.E.L.D.), a television episode
 "Rewind" (Runaways), a television episode
 "Rewind" (The Twilight Zone), a television episode
 Rewind, a character in the TV series The Transformers

Music 
 Rewind Festival, based in the UK
 Rewind (The Wire), the annual music critics' poll of the UK magazine The Wire

Albums
 Re-Wind, by Front Line Assembly, 1998
 Rewind (The Clarks album), 2015
 Rewind (E.M.D. album), 2010
 Rewind (Flame album) or the title song, 2005
 Rewind (Hexstatic album), 2000
 Rewind (Johnny Rivers album), 1967
 Rewind (Rascal Flatts album) or the title song (see below), 2014
 Rewind (1971–1984), by the Rolling Stones, 1984
 Rewind: Deja Screw, by Blaq Poet, 2006
 Rewind: Singles Collection+, by Move, 2004
 Rewind: The Aretha Franklin Songbook, by Christine Anu, 2012
 Rewind: The Unreleased Recordings, by JJ Cale, 2007
 Rewind – Best of 85–97, by Camouflage, 2001
 Rewind – The Best Of, by Diesel, 1996
 Rewind (EP), by Zhou Mi, or the title song, 2014
 Rewind (video), by Stereophonics, 2007
 Rewind, by Ricky Fanté, 2004
 Rewind – The Collection, by Craig David, 2017

Songs
 "Rewind" (Devlin song), 2013
 "Rewind" (Jamie McDell song), 2012
 "Rewind" (Paolo Nutini song), 2006
 "Rewind" (Rascal Flatts song), 2014
 "Rewind" (Stereophonics song), 2005
 "Rewind (Find a Way)", by Beverley Knight, 1998
 "Re-Rewind (The Crowd Say Bo Selecta)", by Artful Dodger, 1999
 "Rewind", by Better Than Ezra from Friction, Baby, 1996
 "Rewind", by Celetia, 1998
 "Rewind", by Craig David from Born to Do It, 2000
 "Rewind", by Flo Rida from R.O.O.T.S., 2009
 "Rewind", by G-Eazy, 2018
 "Rewind", by I Fight Dragons, opening theme for the TV series The Goldbergs, 2013
 "Rewind", by Jolin Tsai from Castle, 2004
 "Rewind", by Kelela from Hallucinogen, 2015
 "Rewind", by Lovelyz from Sanctuary, 2018
 "Rewind", by Pillar from Where Do We Go from Here, 2004
 "Rewind", by Precious from Precious, 2000
 "Rewind", by Tasha Tah and Mumzy Stranger, 2010

Other media
 Rewind (novel), a 1999 novel by William Sleator
 Rewind (radio program), a 2009–2019 Canadian program on CBC Radio One
 Rewind with Gary Bryan, an American nationally syndicated radio program
 YouTube Rewind, an annual video series

See also
 
 RWD Magazine, a British music and lifestyle magazine